Elizabeth Anne Alexander  (born 16 April 1943), a leading Australian accountant and company director, was the 21st Chancellor of the University of Melbourne between 2011 and 2016.

Biography
Alexander is a Fellow of the Society of Certified Practising Accountants, a Fellow of the Institute of Chartered Accountants in Australia, and a Fellow of the Australian Institute of Company Directors where she was a past national president. Alexander is a past national president of CPA Australia. She served as a non-executive director of CSL Limited for twenty years, including five as chairman; is a non-executive director of Dexus and Medibank Private; and has previously served on the boards of Boral, Amcor. The first woman in Australia to be appointed as a partner of one of the big eight accounting firms, Alexander specialised in the area of risk management and corporate governance issues, and was responsible for the establishment of these practices within Australia at PricewaterhouseCoopers. Alexander also served on government regulatory bodies including the Australian Prudential Regulation Authority, the Australian Takeovers Panel, and the Australian Financial Reporting Council.

In 2011 Alexander was appointed as Chancellor of the University of Melbourne and succeeded Alex Chernov, who was appointed as Governor of Victoria.

Alexander was appointed a Member of the Order of Australia in 1990 "In recognition of services to accountancy". She was appointed an Officer in the 2019 Queen's Birthday Honours for "distinguished service to higher education administration, to accounting and corporate governance, and as a role model."

References

External links
 

1943 births
Living people
Australian accountants
Chancellors of the University of Melbourne
University of Melbourne alumni
Officers of the Order of Australia
Recipients of the Centenary Medal
University of Melbourne women
Fellows of the Australian Institute of Company Directors